{{safesubst:#invoke:RfD||2=2022–2023 Russian strikes against Ukraine|month = March
|day =  9
|year = 2023
|time = 15:54
|timestamp = 20230309155402

|content=
REDIRECT 2022–2023 Russian strikes against Ukrainian infrastructure

}}